Courage Has No Color: The True Story of the Triple Nickles, America's First Black Paratroopers is a nonfiction book geared toward children, written by Tanya Lee Stone and published January 22, 2013 by Candlewick Press. The book tells the story of the 555th Parachute Infantry Battalion, nicknamed The Triple Nickles, an all-Black airborne unit of the United States Army during World War II.

In 2014, the book won the NAACP Image Award for Outstanding Literary Work – Youth/Teens.

Reception 
Courage Has No Color is a Junior Library Guild book. It received starred reviews from Booklist, Publishers Weekly, and Kirkus, as well as positive reviews from The Bulletin of the Center for Children's Books, The Washington Post, and School Library Journal.

Kirkus called the book "[a]n exceptionally well-researched, lovingly crafted and important tribute to unsung American heroes." Publishers Weekly called it "[a] captivating look at a small but significant piece of military and civil rights history."

The New York Public Library, The Bulletin, Publishers Weekly, and Kirkus named Courage Has No Color one of the best nonfiction children's books of 2013. The Center for the Study of Multicultural Children's Literature included it in their list of the best multicultural children's books of the year.

References 

2013 non-fiction books
2013 children's books
Books about World War II
Candlewick Press books
NAACP Image Awards